The Kuytun–Altay Expressway, commonly referred to as the Kui'a Expressway, is an expressway that connects the cities of Kuytun and Altay in Xinjiang, China. The entire expressway is part of Asian Highway 67.

The expressway is a spur or auxiliary line of the  G30 Lianyungang–Khorgas Expressway. It connects to the G30 Lianyungang–Khorgas Expressway at Kuytun.

History
The first section of the expressway, from Kuytun to Karamay, which is concurrent with G3015 Kuytun–Tacheng Expressway, opened on October 13, 2012. The section from Karamay to Altay opened on July 1, 2014, fully completing the expressway.

References

Expressways in Xinjiang
Chinese national-level expressways